Glochidion stellatum is a species of plant in the family Phyllanthaceae. It is endemic to Sri Lanka.

External links 
 http://www.theplantlist.org/tpl/record/kew-90765
 https://www.gbif.org/species/3080263/
 https://www.europeana.eu/portal/record/11608/NBGB_NBGB_BELGIUM_BR0000005100064.html
 https://www.biodiversitylibrary.org/name/Glochidion%20stellatum

stellatum
Endemic flora of Sri Lanka
Vulnerable flora of Asia